Bad Company (original title: Mauvaises Fréquentations) is a 1999 French film starring Maud Forget and Lou Doillon. It is a romantic drama about two young students falling in love. The movie is written by Alain Layrac, and directed by Jean-Pierre Améris. A few scenes from this movie are featured in a music video by Lene Marlin for her song, "Where I'm Headed".

Cast 
 Maud Forget : Delphine 
 Lou Doillon : Olivia
 Robinson Stévenin : Laurent
 François Berléand : René
 Ariane Ascaride : Olivia's Mother
 Maxime Mansion : Alain
 Cyril Cagnat : Justin
 Delphine Rich : Claire

Production
Alain Layrac, the screenwriter, said the casting lasted nine months with 2,000-auditions. "Due to the subject of the film, many have given up. The main actress, Maud Forget, had never done anything. And she carries the whole film on her shoulders. When she started the movie, she had never kissed a boy in her life! And she had to play prostitution scenes in a toilet. Many professional actresses had refused", he recalled.

References

External links

1999 films
1990s French-language films
Films directed by Jean-Pierre Améris
Pan-Européenne films
1999 romantic drama films
Universal Pictures films
Films about prostitution in France
French romantic drama films
1990s French films